Luang Namtha (Lao ຫລວງນໍ້າທາ, literally 'royal sugar palm' or "'royal green river') is a province of Laos in the country's north. From 1966 to 1976 it formed, together with Bokeo, the province of Houakhong. Its provincial capital is Luang Namtha. The province borders Yunnan, China to the north, Oudomxai province to the east and southeast, Bokeo province to the southwest, and Shan State, Myanmar to the northwest.

The province contains the Nam Ha National Biodiversity Conservation Area and is one of the main sugar cane and rubber producing areas of Laos with numerous plantations. There are some 20 temples in Muang Sing, including Wat Sing Jai and Wat Namkeo. The anthropological Luang Namtha Museum is in Luang Namtha.

History
The history of Luang Namtha province is traced to inhabitants who lived there about 6,000 years ago, evidenced by archaeological finds of stone implements discovered from the Nam Jook River Valley in Vieng Phoukha. The Xieng Khaeng Chronicles also mention existence of Xieng Khaeng town in the early-15th century, on the shores of the Mekong River. As its prosperity increased it became a vassal of the Lan Na Kingdom of northern Thailand until the early-16th century. From the mid-16th until the early-19th century it came under Burmese control. In the first half of the 19th century, it was under Siamese rule and war-torn. In 1885, Chao Fa Silinor, supported by 1,000 Tai Lue people took control of Muang Sing, attracted by its agricultural lands.

In 1890, the Tai Yuan occupied the Nam Tha Valley for a short period of two years, and thus Muang Houa Tha came to be reestablished. It was during this period that Vat Luang Korn, one of Luang Namtha's biggest temples, was built in 1892. In 1894, the French, British, and Siamese colonists, decreed that the province would be administered by the French. The border was redrawn with the Mekong River serving as the northern border (along its northern reaches of Muang Sing to Chiang Saen) between French Indochina and British Burma. This was followed by migration of the Tai Dam people from Sip Song Chou Tai from northwestern Vietnam who settled in the newly created Tong Jai Village, on the east bank of the Nam Tha River. Other ethnic groups, such as the Tai Neua, Tai Kao, Akha, Lanten, Yao and Lahu  from Sipsongpanna in Burma and northwest Vietnam also migrated to the province. During French colonial rule, the provincial capital of Luang Namtha was the heart of the Sipsongpana civilization, which later moved to Yunnan province in southern China.

After France withdrew from Indochina in the late-1950s, the Houa Thas were in conflict with the US-supported Royal Lao Army against Pathet Lao forces, and from 6 May 1962 the area was under Pathet Lao control. At this time the province was given its present name. The territory between Houei Xay and Vieng Phoukha, known as Houa Khong province, was royalist-controlled until the Lao People's Democratic Republic was established in 1975. From 1975 to 1983 Houa Khong and Luang Namtha were a single province and subsequently divided into Luang Namtha and Bokeo provinces.

The capital of the province, Luang Namtha, had to be shifted in 1976 to a higher ground, by about 7 km, as the original city was not only prone to floods, but was also substantially destroyed during the Second Indochina War. The city has grid pattern layout and is surrounded by green paddy fields and is a hub of economic activity.

Geography
The province is bordered by Yunnan, China to the north, Oudomxai province to the east and southeast, Bokeo province to the southwest, and Burma to the west.
Notable settlements include Luang Namtha, Muang Sing, Ban Oua, Ban Lacha, Ban Tintok, Ban Ko, Pang Kalom, Ban Thang, Ban Nam Kanne, Ban Meo, Ban Pawi, Ban Sa Pouk, Ban He and Ban Tintok.

The Mekong River (Nam Khong) marks the northwest border of the province. Three large rivers, the Nam Tha, Nam Fa and Nam Long, drain westward and southward into the Mekong. The Phou mountain range runs along the Chinese-Lao border, consisting of mainly dry evergreen forest. The main roads in Luang Namtha province connect Houayxay in Bokeo with Luang Namtha town and Oudomxay with Boten. Boten is an important border crossing with China (Mohan), and provides an export route from China, via Xien Kok, loading from trucks into boats on the Mekong. Some of the best preserved monsoon forest (mixed deciduous forest) of Laos can be found in Nam Ha National Biodiversity Conservation Area. It has developed as a sustainable cultural and eco-tourism destination with the help of neighbouring countries, and several organizations including the European Union, UNESCO and the Lao National Tourism Administration. The eco-tourism activities involve trekking, river rafting, camping, kayaking, bird watching and mountain bike tours.

Protected areas
The Nam Ha National Biodiversity Conservation Area (NBCA) has dense forest covering 90% of the area. Heavy fog is common in the morning with warm and sunny middays. Vegetation zones in its plains are between  elevation, consisting of bamboo, secondary evergreen forest and scrub (introduced by humans). In the Southern Highlands, which range between  elevations, there is evergreen forest and scrub. Secondary evergreen forests and scrub are found in the Nam Kong area bordering the Chinese border, lying between elevations . Wildlife reported from the NBCA are wild cattle such as guar and banteng, Asian wild dogs, tigers, clouded leopard, bears, monkeys and gibbons and also muntjac. There are 33 large mammals (of which 22 are key species), including Malayan sun bear and black cheeked crested gibbons, and 288 species of birds (of which 18 are key species). It has been designated as an Asian Heritage Site. One issue of concern is of rubber cultivation in large areas.

The Nam Ha Important Bird Area (IBA),  in size, is in the Nam Ha NBCA. The topography is mountainous ridges. The habitat is dry evergreen forest, upper montane forest, and Imperata grassland. Crested finchbill (Spizixos canifrons), white-bellied redstart (Hodgsonius phaenicuroides), and white-necked laughingthrush (Garrulax strepitans) are unknown in any other Lao IBA. Confirmed fauna include Assamese macaque (Macaca assamensis) and the ungulate gaur (Bos gaurus).

Administrative divisions
The province is made up of the following  five districts:

Demographics
The population of the province as of the 2015 census was 175,753 persons. The ethnic groups reported were the Khamu, Akha (Eko), Hmong, Yao (Ioumien) and Lanetene. Lowland Lao people, Tai Lue, Thai Neua and Thai Dam reside in villages just outside the Nam Ha National Biodiversity Conservation Area close to the town of Muang Sing.

Economy
The province is one of the main sugarcane and rubber producing areas of Laos with numerous plantations. Viengphoukha Coal Mine Co. Ltd., which is mining for lignite, is a major operating company in the province in the mineral sector, as of 2008. Other industries are agriculture, wood processing, lignite and copper mining, handicraft production, transportation and tourism. Shifting cultivation is widely practiced as an economic necessity. Food items such as rice, corn, casava, peanuts, cardamom, rattan, bamboo, jewel orchids, eaglewood, and ginger are used for internal consumption and sale. A wide range of wildlife is consumed or sold. The province has been the site of significant investments by China as part of its Belt and Road Initiative.

Transport

Road
The Route 3 highway connects the Boten International Checkpoint on the border with China and Houayxay, opposite Thailand's Chiang Khong District, sometimes called the Chiang Rai - Kunming R3 highway. Route 13 and the upcoming Vientiane–Boten Expressway also pass through the province, though they do not enter the provincial capital Luang Namtha.

Rail
The Boten–Vientiane railway, which parallels Route 13, serves the province.

Air
The Luang Namtha airport (LXG) has a daily flight to and from Vientiane's Wattay International Airport VTE, QV601/602.

Landmarks
Sing District is mountainous. Muang Sing was a garrison town in the past and the northernmost outpost during French colonial rule. It was known as the center of the Sipsongpana civilization where the relics of old barracks and other colonial buildings can still be seen. The Sipsongpana people have shifted to Yunnan province in southern China. There are many old temples of different styles, but a lot of them were destroyed during the war.

There are some 20 temples in Muang Sing. Of note is Wat Sing Jai or Wat Xieng Jai, behind the Muangsing Guest House. The monastery, painted in hues reminiscent of the Caribbean, has a museum, but because its items are of high local value, it is closed to visitors for fear of theft. Another major temple is Wat Namkeo. The wihan in the town are typically multi-tiered, roofed buildings typical of northern Laos, but most houses have corrugated metal roofs and wooden beams, reflecting the poverty of the area. The Buddhas, however, are golden, and typically have large long earlobes, commonly seen in Xishuangbanna, China, and the Shan State of Burma.

Luang Namtha Museum, also known as Luang Namtha Provincial Museum, is in the capital city of Luang Namtha. Largely an anthropological museum, it contains numerous items related to local peoples such as ethnic clothing, Khamu bronze drums, textiles, ceramics, tools, household utensils, handcrafted weapons, and Buddhism-related items.

Villages
 

Ban Nam Di

References

General references

External links 
Photos of Luang Namtha province
Ecotourism in Laos
Map of Luang Nam Tha province
Wildlife Conservation Society – Nam Ha National Protected Area Project
Tourism as a Tool for Development (PDF-file)

 
Provinces of Laos